This is a list of the tallest structures in Saudi Arabia. The list contains all types of structures taller than 200 metres in Saudi Arabia. Please correct where necessary and expand.

External links 

 https://web.archive.org/web/20140903102539/http://www.ans.gov.sa/SAUDI-AIP/2014-08-21-AIRAC/html/eAIP/OE-ENR-5.4-en-SA.html

Saudi Arabia
Saudi Arabia

Tallest